Liverpool Vision was an Economic Development Company based in Liverpool, England. Set up in 1999, Liverpool Vision was the first Urban Regeneration Company to be founded in the United Kingdom and was tasked with leading the physical transformation of the city into the new millennium. In 2008, a re-organisation of Liverpool Vision saw its operations as a URC merged with both the Liverpool Land Development Company and Business Liverpool to form a single Economic Development Company within Liverpool. Liverpool Vision also offered business support. Liverpool Vision led the Liverpool at World Expo in Shanghai 2010 project.

It was announced in November 2018 that Liverpool Vision was being closed down. Most, but not all, Liverpool Vision staff transferred to the Liverpool City Council to carry on their work.

Projects
Liverpool Vision has spearheaded many urban developments within Liverpool, including:

Baltic Triangle
Commercial District
Echo Arena Liverpool
FACT
Lime Street Gateway
Liverpool ONE
LJMU Art and Design Academy
Metquarter
Museum of Liverpool
Prince's Dock
RopeWalks
Stonebridge Park
Tribeca
QE2 - Liverpool Waterfront

References

External links
Liverpool Vision Official Website

 
Urban Regeneration Companies